Marshal is a surname, and may refer to:

 Alan Marshal (actor) (1909–1961), Australian in Hollywood
 Alan Marshal (cricketer) (1883–1915), Australian cricketer
 Aleksandr Marshal (born 1957), Russian singer, songwriter, and musician
 Alexander Marshal (c. 1620–1682), English entomologist
 Anselm Marshal (died 1245), Anglo-Norman nobleman
 Eva Marshal (1203–1246), Cambro-Norman noblewoman
 Isabel Marshal (1200–1240), medieval English countess
 John Marshal (Marshal of England) (c. 1105–1165), Anglo-Norman nobleman 
 Lyndsey Marshal (born 1978), English actress
 Maud Marshal, Countess of Norfolk, Countess of Surrey (1192–1248), Anglo-Norman noblewoman
 William Marshal, 1st Earl of Pembroke (c. 1147–1219)

See also
 Marshall (surname)